1964 in Korea may refer to:
1964 in North Korea
1964 in South Korea